David Garrison Hill (born July 14, 1964) is a justice of the South Carolina Supreme Court. He previously served as a judge of the South Carolina Court of Appeals from 2017 to 2023.

Early life and education 

D. Garrison Hill was born on July 14, 1964 in Greenville, South Carolina He received a Bachelor of Arts from Wofford College in 1986 and a Juris Doctor from the University of South Carolina Law School in 1989.

Career 

After graduating law school, Hill served as a law clerk to Judge William Walter Wilkins of the United States Court of Appeals for the Fourth Circuit. From 1990 to 2000, he was a member of Hill, Wyatt & Bannister in Greenville.  In 2000, he started Hill & Hill, LLC with his father. From 2004 to 2017, he served as a resident circuit judge for the Thirteenth Circuit. In 2016, he was one of five candidates to fill a vacancy on the court of appeals. On February 1, 2017, he was elected by the South Carolina General Assembly in a 148–0 vote to serve as a judge of the South Carolina Court of Appeals, he succeeded John Cannon Few.

South Carolina Supreme Court 

On February 8, 2023, he was elected by the General Assembly to serve as a justice of the South Carolina Supreme Court in a 140–0 vote. He replaced retired Justice Kaye Gorenflo Hearn, making the South Carolina Supreme Court the only state supreme court in the country without a female justice.

References

External links 

1964 births
Living people
20th-century American judges
20th-century American lawyers
21st-century American judges
Justices of the South Carolina Supreme Court
People from Greenville, South Carolina
South Carolina state court judges
University of South Carolina School of Law alumni
Wofford College alumni